Bank FC is a football club based Laos. They last played in the Lao League, the top national football league in Laos in 2011 when they finished runners up to Lao Police Club. They did not participate in the 2012 season. They had previously participated in the Lao League in 2010 when they competed under the name Bank of Lao. Prior to this they appear to have competed in the Lao League under the name Bank in 2003, 2004, 2005, 2006 and 2007. A team called Banks FC entered the Lao League in 2008 who may be the same team

Sponsors

Honours
 Lao Premier League
 Winners (2): 2001, 2010
 Prime Minister's Cup
 Winners (2): 2010, 2011

References

External links

Football clubs in Laos